The Sierakowski Mansion (Dworek Sierakowskich), one of the oldest buildings in Sopot, Poland, is the seat of the Society of the Friends of Sopot (Towarzystwo Przyjaciół Sopotu). There is an art gallery which holds exhibitions all over the year, the Mansion provides a venue for meetings organized under a "Theatre at the Table" world dramaturgy series ("Teatr przy stole") and musical evenings on Thursdays ("Czwartkowe Wieczory Muzyczne") - meetings that feature chamber music, organized without a break since 1974.

References
 www.sopot.pl
 www.tps-dworek.pl

Buildings and structures in Sopot
Tourist attractions in Pomeranian Voivodeship